William Henry Tudor (1918–1965) born in Shotton, Flintshire, was a Welsh professional footballer who played in the Football League as a defender.

References
 . Retrieved 22 October 2013.

1918 births
1965 deaths
Welsh footballers
Association football defenders
West Bromwich Albion F.C. players
Wrexham A.F.C. players
Bangor City F.C. players
Pwllheli F.C. players
Flint Town United F.C. players
English Football League players
People from Shotton, Flintshire
Sportspeople from Flintshire